Giuseppe Valadier (April 14, 1762 – February 1, 1839) was an Italian architect and designer, urban planner and archaeologist and a chief exponent of Neoclassicism in Italy.

Biography
The son of a goldsmith, Luigi (1726–1785), Valadier was born in Rome in 1762. He also occasionally provided designs for silver, such as the "York Chalice" for Henry Cardinal York (1800–01), the grand silver table service for Monsignor Antonio Odescalchi (1795–97) and the similar Rospigliosi-Pallavicini service, begun in 1803  which he partly produced in the silver workshop he directly oversaw and partly sub-contracted to other Roman silversmiths. Valadier also designed some furniture and other decorative arts, such as the rock crystal and silver reliquary for relics of the Holy Crib in Santa Maria Maggiore, for Pope Pius IX. Valadier worked in Rome and elsewhere in the Papal States, but many of his projects remained on paper. He was named official  architetto camerale of the Papal States by Pope Pius VI in 1786. He taught architecture at the Accademia di San Luca was a pioneer archeologist and a restorer of monuments, such as the Milvian Bridge (1805) and the Arch of Titus in Rome, (1819–21). He retraced the ancient line of the Via Flaminia (1805) and restored Giacomo Barozzi da Vignola's neglected Church of Sant'Andrea in Via Flaminia, which influenced his own Church of Santa Maria della Salute in Fiumicino, the newly-establish port for Rome.

Major works

Villa Pianciani, Spoleto;
Clocks with mosaic faces on top of the façade belltowers, Basilica of Saint Peter (1786–90);
Villa Torlonia, Rome (1806 onwards);
General plan for access to the Imperial Forums (1811);
General plans for Piazza del Popolo (first plans, 1793; final plans executed 1816–20), creating its elliptical plan and linking it via stairs and terraces with the Pincio, including the Casina Valadier (1816 onwards) in the Borghese Gardens;
Teatro Valle (1819);
Fiumicino (1822); the first planned suburb of modern Rome (1823–28);
Church of Santa Maria della Salute, Fiumicino
Restoration of the Arch of Titus, including the outer portion of the arch, and exterior columns)(1821-1822)
opening of Via di Ripetta, Rome, via del Babuino, and via della Caserma (1822);
Church of San Rocco, façade, in Ripetta (1831)
Palazzo Nainer, via del Babuino (1819–21), now a hotel.
79, via del Babuino (1826); the architect's own home.
General plan for the piazza of St John Lateran;
 
He published collections of his designs and drawings: 
Giuseppe Valadier, (Architectonic projects), Rome 1807
Giuseppe Valadier, Raccolta delle più insigni fabbriche di Roma antica, Rome 1810
Giuseppe Valadier, L'Architettura pratica: dettata nella Scuola dell'insigne Accademia di San Luca, 5 vols, Rome 1828– 1834;

References

Further reading
Paolo Marconi. 1964. Giuseppe Valadier (Rome)
Alvar Gonzalez-Palacios, Il Gusto Dei Principi, 1993, nos. 366–368. (designs and wine-coolers from the Odescalchi service)
Valadier: Three Generations of Roman Goldsmiths: An exhibition of drawings and works of art. London: Artemis Group / David Carritt Limited, 1991.

External links 

 Neoclassical architect Giuseppe Valadier died on 1st February 1839 in Rome
 Giuseppe Valadier (1762—1839)


1762 births
1839 deaths
18th-century Italian architects
19th-century Italian architects
Italian neoclassical architects
Architects from Lazio
Artists from Rome